Callide is an electoral division in Queensland, Australia.

It encompasses agricultural and mining towns in the Burnett, Callide and Dawson valleys. Major towns within the division's boundaries include Biloela, Calliope, Chinchilla, Jandowae, Miles, Bell, Monto, Eidsvold, Gin Gin, Biggenden, Gayndah, Mundubbera, Moura, Banana, Theodore, Baralaba, Taroom and Wandoan.

Located in traditional National territory, it has been in the hands of either that party or the merged Liberal National Party for its entire existence.

A by-election was held on the 18th of June, 2022, following the resignation of Colin Boyce. LNP candidate Bryson Head was elected.

Members for Callide

Election results

References

External links
 Electorate profile (Antony Green, ABC)

Callide